Malaya Cup was a tournament held annually by a Malaya Cup committee.

This is the fifth season of Malaya Cup (later known as Malaysia Cup). It were contested by states in Malaya. The final were contested by the southern and northern champions in their respective conference round. Six states sent their teams. The final were held at Anson Road Stadium on 29 August 1925 where Singapore recorded their first hat-trick of winning Malaya Cup, by defeating Selangor with scoreline 2–1. The match was a rematch of last year's final and first final in Singapore.

Conference Round
Six teams participated the second edition of the Malaya Cup, Malacca, Negeri Sembilan, Singapore, Penang, Selangor and Perak. The teams were divided into two conference, the Northern Section and Southern Section. The Northern Section comprises Penang, Selangor and Perak while Southern Section represented by Johor, Negeri Sembilan, Malacca and Singapore. Each team will play with each other (two games per team) and the winners of each conference will play in the final. Each win will give the team 2 points while losing will give 0 points. A draw means a point were shared between two teams.

Northern Section

Southern Section

Final
The final were held at Anson Road Stadium, Singapore on 29 August 1925. The match was a rematch of last year's final, with Singapore recorded their first hat-trick of winning Malaya Cup, by defeating Selangor with scoreline 2–1. This is the first final played in Singapore.

Winners

References

External links
1922 Malaya Cup Results by Rec.Sport.Soccer Statistics Foundation(RSSSF)

1925 in Malayan football
Malaysia Cup seasons